Laganadi is a comune (municipality) in the Metropolitan City of Reggio Calabria in the Italian region Calabria, located about  southwest of Catanzaro and about  northeast of Reggio Calabria.  

Laganadi borders the following municipalities: Calanna, Reggio Calabria, San Roberto, Sant'Alessio in Aspromonte, Santo Stefano in Aspromonte.

References

External links
 Official website

Cities and towns in Calabria